Peaceable Kingdom is an American family drama television series that aired on CBS from September 20 until November 15, 1989. The series was cancelled after only seven episodes (though twelve episodes were produced).

Overview
Peaceable Kingdom stars Lindsay Wagner as the recently hired managing director of the Los Angeles County Zoo, who was also recently widowed with three children. Her zoologist colleagues included Tom Wopat and David Ackroyd.

Perhaps due to scheduling competition from other networks (NBC's Top 20 hit Unsolved Mysteries and ABC's Top 30 hits Growing Pains and Head of the Class), Peaceable Kingdom was a ratings failure and CBS cancelled the series after seven episodes. The remaining episodes aired some years later in syndication.

Some scenes of the series was shot on location at San Diego Zoo and Los Angeles Zoo.

Cast
 Lindsay Wagner as Rebecca Cafferty
 Melissa Clayton as Courtney Cafferty
 Michael Manasseri as Dean Cafferty
 Victor Di Mattia as Sam Cafferty
 David Ackroyd as Dr. Bartholomew Langley
 Tom Wopat as Dr. Jed McFadden
 Conchata Ferrell as Kate Galindo
 David Renan as Sequoya Ridge
 Kathryn Spitz as Robin

Episodes

References

Brooks, Tim, and Marsh, Earle, The Complete Directory to Prime Time Network and Cable TV Shows

External links
 

CBS original programming
1980s American drama television series
1989 American television series debuts
1989 American television series endings
English-language television shows
Television shows set in Los Angeles
Television series by Sony Pictures Television